Joyce Thies is an American writer of romance novels. She began her writing career as a coauthor with Janet Bieber, writing under the names Janet Joyce and Jenna Lee Joyce; together they wrote more than fifteen romances. Now, she writes romance novels under her real name.

Bibliography

As Joyce Thies

Single Novels
Territorial Rgts	1984/06
Still Waters, 1987/01
Spellbound	1987/03
False pretenses	1987/05
The primorose path	1987/08
Moon of the raven	1988/05
Reach for the moon	1988/07
Call Down the Moon	1989/04
Pride and joy	1991/01

Hubbard Series
King of the mountain	1990/01
The drifter	1991/03

Omnibus in Collaboration
WESTERN LOVERS: Hitched in Haste / A Marriage of Convenience / Where Angels Fear / Mountain Man / The Hawk and the Honey / Wild Horse Canyon / Someone Waiting	1989/01 (with Doreen Owens; Gray Ginna; Dixie Browning; Elizabeth August; Joan Malek Hohl)

References

20th-century American novelists
American romantic fiction writers
American women novelists
Living people
20th-century American women writers
Year of birth missing (living people)
21st-century American women